The Pilgrim Mother Campaign, also known as the Schoenstatt Rosary Campaign, is an apostolic work founded by the Servant of God John Pozzobon and coordinated by the Schoenstatt Movement, counting presently more than 30 million members in over one million groups spanning 120 nations of the world.

Overview 
The Campaign consists in the regular visit of an image of the Mother Thrice Admirable of Schoenstatt Madonna to families, schools, hospitals and all places where families or people accept to receive her. It is carried out by lay volunteers - missionaries and coordinators - organized at the parish, diocesan, regional or linguistic levels.

The pilgrim image employed in the campaign is the same venerated in the Schoenstatt Shrines. They are replicas of the 'original pilgrim image' with which the campaign began and have the form of a sanctuary to express the essential link to the Schoenstatt Shrine and all the graces that there are received. They are blessed and sent from a Schoenstatt Shrine. The Secretariats of the Campaign of the Pilgrim Mother of Schoenstatt have the function of coordinating and help the missionaries in their work and relationship with dioceses and parishes.

History 

It was initiated by the Servant of God, Deacon John Pozzobon, a Schoenstatt Movement's member, on 10 September 1950. Feeling an inner call to get involved in some apostolate with Our Lady, he receives an invitation from Sister Teresinha Gobbo, from the Secular Institute of Schoenstatt Sisters of Mary, to bring the image of the Mother, Queen and Winner Thrice Admirable of Schoenstatt to visit the families. Sister Teresinha entrusts him the image that had been blessed at the Schoenstatt Shrine of Santa Maria (Brazil) by Father Celestino Trevisan, telling him: "This image will be under your care. You don't need to pray the rosary every night. You should only take care that it peregrinates from home to home."

John accepted this invitation. He assumes the task of taking the Pilgrim Mother of Schoenstatt to the families and exercises this mission for 35 years until the date of his death on 27 June 1985. With her, he travels over 87,000 miles carrying the Madonna picture in a shrine-shaped frame weighing over 25 pounds.

From 1959, the Campaign multiplies through smaller replicas of the Pilgrim Mother to visit families monthly. In 1979, Pozzobon visits Germany and Rome, and the Pilgrim Mother Campaign takes an international dimension.

Theological Rationale 
The Campaign is inspired by the attitude of Mary who went to visit her cousin Elizabeth (Luke 1: 39-41). It is an ecclesial ministry that the Church and the service of the Church, wants to collaborate with the ordinary pastoral care of parishes.

It is a popular apostolic work, as it seeks to reach all people in all situations of life, adapting to different pastoral realities: families, schools, hospitals, prisons, etc., following Jesus command: "Go into all the world and preach the Gospel to every creature" (Mark 16: 15).

Another source of inspiration is the idea of the universal apostolic work according to Saint Vincent Pallotti regarding Mary: "She is the great Missionary; She works miracles". It also performs a will of the founder of the Schoenstatt Movement, Fr. Joseph Kentenich, expressed in 1948, to bring the Mother of God to the homes and give Her a place of honor, for that they become small shrines.

Walking the pilgrimage way with Mary means, Father Kentenich argued, being drawn into Mary's mission by bearing, bringing, and serving Christ. becoming another Mary: "Each of us bears a large share of the responsibility for the form that the world will take in the future. If this future—regardless of the specific characteristics it will have — is to bear the resemblance of Christ, then Mary must step more into the foreground and be acknowledged everywhere as the official Christ-giver, Christ-bearer, and Christ-bringer."

Modalities 
There are various types of "pilgrim images", according to the ministry on which they are used:

The Original Pilgrim Image 
It is the image with which Deacon John Pozzobon began the Pilgrim Mother Campaign in September 1950. This image was his 'pilgrimage companion' for more than 30 years. In 1980, he returned it to Sr. Terezinha Gobbo. Since Pozzobon's death, in 1985, the Pilgrim Original is kept in the Marian Center, home of the Schoenstatt Movement in Santa Maria (Brazil).

Auxiliary Pilgrim Images 
They are the images intended for a diocese, a diocesan shrine or a more specific apostolic work. The first one was received by Ubaldo Pimentel, also from Santa Maria (Brazil), on 8 December 1979. They are exact replicas of the original Pilgrim Image. According to interpretation of Deacon John Pozzobon, the Auxiliary Images are like an 'extension' of  Fr. Kentenich's blessing to the Campaign, on 4 August 1951. As an expression of their union with the 'Original', all 'Auxiliaries' are blessed and sent from the Schoenstatt Shrine of Santa Maria, where the campaign began.

Parish Pilgrim Images 
Similar to the Original image and the Auxiliaries, but made in a smaller size and without the doors covering the picture of Mary. Each parish can have its image to use it in novenas, processions and other activities. Some parishes organize an itinerary for its parish image, where it visits the various chapels, schools, church groups, etc. Normally, the parish pilgrim image is under the care of the parish coordination team, which may delegate responsibility to a leadership campaign.

'Occasional' Pilgrim Images 

Used in various apostolic works of the Campaign of the Pilgrim Mother of Schoenstatt: the sick, in shops, hospitals, prisons, etc. They are entrusted to a missionary who organizes the itinerary and the form of ministry. All images are registered with the national secretariat of the Campaign.

Pilgrim Images for Families 
The most known and used in the world by the Campaign, they circulate monthly and on a permanent basis a group of families. Each image is in the care of a missionary, responsible for the image in his group. All have a number registered in the secretariat responsible for the geographic area.

Pilgrim Images for Children and Youth 
They are entrusted to young people and children who are placed as apostles for other young people and children. They can also be used in schools and catechism groups. All images used in this ministry are registered with the secretariat of the Campaign.

List of countries or territories (per continent) where the Pilgrim Mother Campaign is present

This list follows the geoscheme created by the United Nations Statistics Division. According to the UN, the assignment of countries or areas to specific groupings is for statistical convenience and does not imply any assumption regarding political or other affiliation of countries or territories.

Some countries may have more than one website on this list, for linguistic or organizational reasons. Others, for the same reasons, may share a single site.

Countries with the field "website" in blank mean that the country doesn't have a webpage dedicated exclusively to the Campaign's Secretariat.

Source of the data: Pilgrim Mother Campaign Secretariat from Brazil for Southern and Southeastern regions and German-speaking Secretariat from Switzerland, except where another source be expressly indicated.

Africa

Americas

Asia

Notes
Transcontinental countries in Europe and Asia, classified as Eastern European countries by the United Nations Statistics Division:  .

Europe

 Notes

Oceania

Antarctica
Antarctica, regulated by the Antarctic Treaty System, has no government and belongs to no country. It was there that a bronze image of the Mother Thrice Admirable of Schoenstatt was installed in 1984 at the Comandante Ferraz Antarctic Station, located at the King George Island, in the Admiralty Bay.

See also 

 Servant of God John Pozzobon;
 Schoenstatt Movement;
 Father Joseph Kentenich.

References

External links 
 Video about the Schoenstatt Rosary Campaign.

Catholic lay organisations
Marian devotions